Inayat Hussain Bhatti 
(),  
(12 January 1928 – 31 May 1999) was a Pakistani film playback singer, film actor, producer, director, script writer, social worker, columnist, religious scholar and a promoter of the development of the Punjabi language and literature.

Early life history
Bhatti was born in Gujrat on 12 January 1928 in a Punjabi family.

In December 1948, he moved to Lahore to study law and initially stayed at MAO College Lahore hostel in Lahore. A few months after his arrival in Lahore, he did his first performance on stage in the YMCA Hall, Lahore. After his YMCA auditorium performance, Bhatti accompanied Ijaz Gilani to Radio Pakistan, Lahore, where he met and became a formal pupil of Master Niaz Hussain Shami, a composer then working for Radio Pakistan in Lahore. It was his association with and training under Master Niaz Hussain Shami, which facilitated Bhatti's participation in regular radio programs as a singer. He sometimes used to accept character roles in plays broadcast by the Lahore station of Radio Pakistan. Rafi Peer, a play- writer, asked him to be the 'hero' in his play Akhhian (Eyes).

Bhatti was introduced to composer Ghulam Ahmed Chishti by Master Shami in 1949, who offered him an opportunity to record a few songs in producer-director Nazir Ahmed Khan's film Pheray (1949). After this film's popularity, Bhatti became an almost overnight celebrity. Producer-director Nazir offered Bhatti Sahib the leading role in his Punjabi film Heer (1955 film) against Swaran Lata.

Death
In 1997, he suffered an attack of paralysis, which impaired his speech and kept him bed-ridden for most of the time thereafter. A few days before his death, the 71-year-old artiste was taken to his native home Gujrat, where on 31 May 1999, he died and was buried next to his parents.

Career in folk theater
During the 1960s, Bhatti also took to folk theatre acting and singing, and toured the rural hinterland of the Punjab along with his theatre group, where he performed his songs and recitation of the works of the great Sufi poets such as 'Waris Shah, Bulleh Shah, Mian Muhammad Bakhsh, Sultan Bahoo and Shah Abdul Latif Bhittai'.

During the 1960s and early 1970s, both Bhatti and Alam Lohar dominated the folk theatre genre in Punjab.

In 1996 Bhatti was invited to attend a Cultural Mela in Mohali, India, by the then Minister of East Punjab, Mr. Harnek Singh Gharun, the Indian National Congress leader.

Career in films
Bhatti was the only male artist in Pakistan film industry who achieved super stardom both as an actor and a singer simultaneously. 
His first venture, as a film producer was the film Waris Shah (1962), based upon the life and works of the great Sufi poet of Punjab. His second film as a producer Moonh Zor (1965) was also not successful, but then in 1967 his third film Chann Makhna (1968) in which he played the lead role, proved to be a block buster at the box office and received the Nigar Award as the best picture of 1968. This was followed by a string of hit movies such as Sajjan Pyara (1968), Jind Jan (1969), Duniya Matlab Di (1970), Ishq Diwana (1971), and Zulam Da Badla (1972) which transformed Bhatti into a superstar actor of the Punjabi movies. He also produced, directed and acted in three Saraiki language films simultaneously. The themes of all movies produced by him, were based on some social malady of the Punjabi culture.

During his film career, spanning almost five decades, he produced 30 films under the banner of Bhatti Pictures and acted in more than three hundred films. He rendered his voice for approximately 500 films, recording more than 2500 film and non-film songs in Urdu, Punjabi, Sindhi and Saraiki languages. One of his naat in Arabic is regularly broadcast on Radio Pakistan Lahore, during the holy month of Ramadan since the last four decades.
Bhatti's patriotic song 'Allah-O-Akbar' from the film Genghis Khan (1958) has become a signature tune for the Pakistan Army. The music for this song was composed by veteran music director Rasheed Attre.

Brief chronology of his songs

Aakhiyan Laanveen Naan – Pheray(1949)
 – Shammi (1950)
 – Laarey (1950),
 – Shehri Babu (1953)
 – Heer
 – Heer
 – Heer
 – Ishq-e-Laila (1957)
 – Ishq-e-Laila (1957)
 – Zulfaan (1957)
 – Kartar Singh
 – Kartar Singh
 – Mitti dian Moortan (1960)
 – Saltanat (1960)
 – Chacha Khamkha (1963)
 – Waris Shah (1964)
 – Hadd haram (1965)
 – Moonh Zor (1966)
 – Sham Sevayra (1967)
 – Chann Makhna (1968)
 – Sajjan Pyara (1968)
 – Jind Jan (1969)
 – Kochwan (1969)
 – Duniya Matlab Di (1970)
 – Rab Di Shan (1970)
 – Sajjan Beli (1970)
 – Duniya Paisay Di (1971)
 – Geo Jatta (1971)
 – Ishq Diwana (1971)
 – Sucha Souda (1971)
 – Dhol Jawanian Mane (1972)
 – Dil Naal Sajjan De (1972)
 – Zulam Da Badla (1972)
 – Dhian Nimanian (1973)
 – Challenge (1974)
 – Dharti Dey Lal (1974)
 – Sohna Daku (1974)
 – Rab Da Roop (1975)
 – Dankay Di Chot (1976)
 – Jagga Gujjar (1976)
 – Haider Dalair (1978)
 – Maula Jatt (1979)
 – Gernail Singh (1987)
 – Jat Majheh Da (1988)

His film music directors include: Ghulam Ahmed Chishti, Master Inayat Hussain, Ghulam Haider, Asghar Ali, Mohammad Hussain, Rasheed Attre, Safdar Hussain, Gul Haider, Mehnu, Tufail Farooqi, Akhtar Hussain, Rehman Verma, Aashiq Hussain, Qadir Faridi, Rafiq Ali, Shad Amrohi, Taalib Hussain, Kamal Ahmed, Salim Iqbal, Tasadduq Hussain, Mohammad Ali Shabbir, Wazir Ali, M Ashraf, Ustad Tafu, Bhagg Gee, Master Abdullah, Nazir Ali, Bakhshi-Wazir and Wajahat Attre.

Beside his solo career as a playback singer, he is credited with singing hundreds of film duet songs with Noor Jehan and Malika Pukhraj to Mala, Irene Parveen, Zubaida Khanum, Munawar Sultana, Kausar Parveen, Naseem Begum, Nahid Niazi, Tassawar Khanum and Afshan.
As a tribute to this legend, his numerous hit songs have been remixed by the new generation of Pakistani singers including Abrar-ul-Haq, Shazia Manzoor, Naseebo Lal, Arif Lohar and many others.

Filmography

Pheray (1949)
Jalan (1949)
Shehri Babu (1953)
Heer
Morni (1956)
Kartar Singh (1959)
Waris Shah (1964)
Moonh Zor (1966)
Sham Savera (1967)
Chann Makhna (1968)
Sajjan Pyara (1968)
Jind Jan (1969)
Kochwaan (1969)
Duniya Matlab Di (1970)
Sajjan Beli (1970)
Sucha Sauda (1971)
Ishq Deewana (1971)
Dhol Jawanian Mane (1972)
Sajjan Dushman (1972)
 Melay Sajna Day (1972)
 Ucha Samala Jat Da (1972)
 Zindagi Kay Melay (1972)
 Dil Nal Sajjan Dey (1972)
 Zulam Da Badla (1972)
 Dhian Nimanian (1973) (Inayat Hussain Bhatti was the producer, director and lead actor of this film)
 Ghairt Da Parchawan (1973)
Rano (1974)
 Tota Chassam (1974)
Saza-e-Mout (1974)
Dharti Dey Lal (1974)
Paishaver Badmash (1975)
Rabb Da Roop (1975)
 Maja Saja (1975)
Khooni Khet (1975)
Jagga Gujjar (1976)
Ultimatum (1976)
Danke Di Chot (1976)
Sadkey Teri Maut Ton (1977)
Haider Delair (1978)
Takht Ya Takhta (1979)
Dangal (1979)
Badmashi Band (1980)
Lahu Dey Rishtay (1980)
Mile Ga Zulm Da Badla (1981)
Taaqat (1984)
Jatt Majhay Da (1989)
Ishq Rog (1989)

His female co-stars include: Swaran Lata, Zeenat, Nigar Sultana, Bahar Begum, Meena Shorey, Shirin, Yasmeen, Sabira Sultana, Zummarad, Saiqa, Massarat Shaheen, Naghma, Sangeeta, Rani, Firdous, Saloni, Aasiya, Rukhsana Husna, Neelo and Khannum.

Television career
In the early 1970s, he did Bhatti Da Dayrah, a musical cum talk show every week for a year. In the 1990s, Bhatti compered a series of TV programmes entitled Ujala on the Sufi saints of Pakistan, and wrote its scripts. The series provided the viewers a look in his Sufistic leanings, and the lives and works of the Sufi poets. It earned its producer, Qaisar Ali Shah, the Ptv Award for best religious program.

As a columnist
For years his column 'Challenge' graced the Urdu newspaper Daily Pakistan. In this column, he pointed out the maladies of Pakistani society without any fear.

Social work
In 1971, he built and donated a 'Complete Tuberculosis Treatment Ward' for poor and needy patients in Gulab Devi Hospital, Lahore in the name of his mother Barkat Bibi. Until his death in 1999, he supported it financially and with other services.
He was against religious sectarianism and was respected by religious scholars of all shades; the Government of Punjab had, on numerous occasions, sought his help in creating religious harmony by way of appointing him as a member of Ittihad Bainul Muslimeen Organisation and a member of the Peace Committee.

Politics
Bhatti also dabbled in politics by joining Pakistan Peoples Party of Zulfikar Ali Bhutto in 1975. He surprised everyone with his speeches and turned out to be an excellent orator, during the election campaigns of 1977 and 1988, he energetically campaigned for his party, often attending and addressing several different rallies in a single day. During the late 1980s, he was appointed 'secretary of party's cultural wing', a position which he held for a year and then resigned because of his various other commitments.

In 1985 elections, during General Muhammad Zia-ul-Haq’s regime, he contested for a seat in the National Assembly of Pakistan from NA 95, and lost by a narrow margin. Later in his life, he joined All Jammu and Kashmir Muslim Conference of Sardar Muhammad Abdul Qayyum Khan, with whom he shared a cordial relationship.
He was a protagonist of the development of Punjabi language and literature. In the 1970s, along with two other like minded personalities, Mr. Zia Shahid (now chief editor of daily newspaper, Khabrain), and Mr. Masood Khaderposh (a retired bureaucrat), he started the publication of a weekly magazine Kahani (story) for the endorsement of Punjabi language and literature. Bhatti Sahib was also the chairman of Punjab Workers Movement, founded in the 1980s for the same objectives.
He was also an outstanding speaker on different themes of Islam, addressed hundreds of "majalis" and participated in Muharram congregations regularly.

Achievements
Bhatti's efforts did not go unrewarded, some of the honours bestowed by the Pakistani society at large are:

Awards and decorations
In recognition of his social services, the Pakistan Medical Association on 2 January 1974, awarded him with Medical College Color, the ceremony was held at Nishtar Medical College, Multan. He is the first and until today, the only non-medical person in the subcontinent to receive this honour.
After Prince Karim Agha Khan IV and the late prime minister Zulfikar Ali Bhutto, he became the third person to be given honorary life membership of the Punjab Press Club during the mid 1970s.
Gold medal from the chief minister of Sindh for his patriotic song 'Allah-o-Akbar'.
Gold Medal from Pakistan Peoples Party (1976).
Lifetime Achievement Award from Nigar Awards.
Lifetime Achievement Award from Bolan Academy.
Honorary life membership of the Pakistan Film Producers' Association.
President of Rajput Bhatti Association of Pakistan
Life chairman of Pakistan Singers' Association.
Chairman of rehabilitation council of Gulab Devi Hospital, Lahore.
Shields and trophies presented to him by Lions Clubs International and Rotary Club Multan on 2 January 1974, for his services to promote Saraiki culture through his Saraiki films and songs.
EMI recording company awarded him a Silver Disc for his 25th year of association with the company (7 December 1976).
Golden Jubilee film award from Jang Group of Newspapers on 4 July 1996.
Numerous other awards, medals, shields and commendation certificates from various literary Punjabi committees and associations.

Pakistan Army
For his patriotic songs, Bhatti was bestowed with the following honours by the Pakistan Armed Forces:
He was the honorary member of numerous army units.
Shields of honour from

12 Medium Regiment, Artillery [on the eve of 32nd raising day].
Officers of 43 Baluch Regiment.
48 Signal Battalion [7 January 1993].
The Century six Artillery Unit.

 In India as a visitor
He was equally popular across the border in East Punjab (India) and was bestowed with the following honours.
Awarded with a shield and a trophy by Rotary Club Amritsar South [23 July 1980]
Awarded with a medallion and a trophy on the occasion of 11 December 1996, International Punjabi Cultural Festival at Mohali [26–27 November 1996]
Awarded a shield by Chandigarh Press Club, Chandigarh, India, presented to him by the honourable Mr. Justice Amarjit Chaudry, acting chief justice of the Punjab and Haryana High Court [22 October 1997].
Awarded a shield by the Punjabi Intellectual Forum Chandigarh [25 October 1997]
shield and a medallion by Sur layamunch Jalandhar [24 December 1997]
Shield and medallion by Prof. Mohan Singh Foundation, Amritsar [1997]
After his demise in 1999, Prof. Mohan Singh Foundation Amritsar, announced the "Inayat Hussain Bhatti Memorial Award" as a tribute to him. The first award under this category was awarded to Jasbir Jassi Gurdaspuria of Kudi Kudi fame, in 2001 at Ludhiana, India.
Inayat Hussain Bhatti has sung poetry of Sufi poets including Waris Shah, Bulleh Shah, Khawaja Ghulam Farid, Mian Muhammad Bakhsh and Shah Abdul Latif Bhittai.

Personal life
In 1953, Bhatti married Mohtarma Shahida Bano, the daughter of Ahmed Din Butt, a retired superintendent of the Indian Railways. Mohtarma Shahida Banoo died on 12 March 1997.

Bhatti's children include two sons, three daughters, eleven grandsons and five grand daughters. His youngest son Waseem Abbas is a film, TV and stage artist. The actors Agha Ali and Ali Abbas, are his grandsons.

Bhatti's younger brother, known by the stage name Kaifee, was an actor and director from the mid-1960s until the late 1990s. He was born Kifayat Hussain Bhatti (1943-13 March 2009). Both brothers were well-known film actors as well as film producers. They appeared together in more than 24 Pakistani movies- mostly movies made in the Punjabi language. As Kifayat liked to use his nickname of 'Kaifi' on film screens and on his movie credits, all Pakistani official film records and most international large websites list his records under his one word nickname 'Kaifi'. Inyat Hussain Bhatti spent last days of his life with his daughter Rehana Waqar Jaura at Gujrat. He fell ill and was treated in Aziz Bhatti Shaheed Hospital. He died on 31 May 1999 and was buried in Chah Tring graveyard in Gujrat.

References

External links
, Inayat Hussain Bhatti Filmography on IMDb website

1928 births
1999 deaths
People from Gujrat District
Punjabi people
20th-century Pakistani male singers
Pakistani male film actors
Pakistani folk singers
Punjabi-language singers
Pakistani film producers
Pakistani Muslims
20th-century Pakistani male actors
Performers of Sufi music
Singers from Punjab, Pakistan
Pakistani playback singers
Nigar Award winners